Ramón Marcos Enrique Monserrat (born 4 March 1988), better known by his stage name Moncho, is a Swedish rapper, singer, and songwriter. He competed in Melodifestivalen 2018 with the song "Cuba Libre", and qualified to andra chansen. He is the brother of Swedish rapper Dani M, and was born in Sweden to a Finnish mother and Venezuelan father.

Discography

Singles

References

1988 births
Living people
Swedish rappers
Swedish male singers
Swedish people of Finnish descent
Swedish people of Venezuelan descent
Universal Music Group artists
People from Gävle
People from Uppsala
Swedish hip hop musicians
Melodifestivalen contestants of 2018